Wild Horse Creek is a tributary of the Powder River in Wyoming. The USGS has a station on the creek, near Arvada.

References

Rivers of Wyoming